Lester Smith (born August 16, 1970 in Concord, North Carolina) was a football player in the CFL for eight years. Smith played defensive back for the Baltimore Stallions, Toronto Argonauts and Montreal Alouettes from 1994-2001. He was a CFL All-Star in 1997 and won two Grey Cup Championships (1995 and 1996) with the Stallions and Argos. He played college football at The Citadel, The Military College of South Carolina, where he was a two-time All-American and had his #15 jersey retired.

References

1970 births
Living people
African-American players of Canadian football
Baltimore Stallions players
Canadian football defensive backs
Montreal Alouettes players
People from Concord, North Carolina
The Citadel Bulldogs football players
Toronto Argonauts players
21st-century African-American sportspeople
20th-century African-American sportspeople